The Constellation class is a series of 11 container ships built for Cosco Shipping Lines. The maximum theoretical capacity is in the range of 19,237 to 20,119 TEU.

List of ships

See also 

 Universe-class container ship

References 

Container ship classes
Ships of COSCO Shipping